Ángel Bahamonde Magro (born 1949) is a Spanish historian. He is professor of Contemporary History at the Charles III University of Madrid (UC3M).

Biography 
Born in Madrid in 1949, he earned a PhD in history from the Complutense University of Madrid (UCM), reading a dissertation titled El horizonte económico de la burguesía isabelina. Madrid 1856-1866, supervised by José María Jover. In 1992, he was appointed to a chair in the area of "Contemporary History" at the UCM. He moved to the UC3M in 2003. Prior to that he was also a lecturer at Toulouse-Le Mirail and Paris-Saint Denis.

He has worked on the research topics of the social history of cities during the 19th century, history of communications and their role in the modern Spanish state building, the study of the elites in Spanish society, the Spanish Civil War and the intermingling of politics and sport in 20th century Spain.

Works 

Author
 
 
Co-author

References 
Citations

Bibliography
 
 
 
 
 
 
 
 
 
 
 

20th-century Spanish historians
Historians of the Spanish Civil War
Academic staff of the Charles III University of Madrid
Academic staff of the Complutense University of Madrid
Writers about Madrid
Complutense University of Madrid alumni
Local historians
1949 births
Living people
21st-century Spanish historians